Mark Rees (born 13 October 1989) is an English former footballer who played in the Football League as a winger for Walsall and also had a short loan spell with Rochdale.

Career
Born in Smethwick, Rees played for England at schoolboy level, signing professional terms with Walsall in August 1978. Between 1978 and 1990, Rees made over 230 Football League appearances for the Saddlers, scoring 37 times. During his time with the club, he aided them to promotion in 1987 via the Football League play-offs and also scored a winning goal against Arsenal at Highbury in the League Cup in 1984. Following two successive relegations with Walsall at the end of the 1980s, Rees was released. During his time with the club, Rees had a short loan spell with Rochdale during the 1986–87 season where he made three league appearances.

Following an operation on his hamstring, Rees joined recently relegated Colchester United in the Football Conference on a weekly contract on 3 September 1990. He made a few appearances for the reserve team, and only played in the first-team on one occasion, a 3–1 win at Layer Road against Cheltenham Town on 22 September, coming on for goalscorer Gary Bennett.

Rees left Colchester to play in Luxembourg briefly, before heading to the Republic of Ireland to play for Shamrock Rovers making his League of Ireland debut on 18 November at the RDS Arena. He only made one other league appearance before returning home. He also represented English non-league teams, including Aldershot, Dover Athletic, Shrewsbury Town, Solihull Borough and Stafford Rangers.

References

1961 births
Living people
Sportspeople from Smethwick
English footballers
Association football wingers
Walsall F.C. players
Rochdale A.F.C. players
Colchester United F.C. players
Shamrock Rovers F.C. players
Aldershot F.C. players
Dover Athletic F.C. players
Shrewsbury Town F.C. players
Solihull Borough F.C. players
Stafford Rangers F.C. players
English Football League players
National League (English football) players
League of Ireland players
Expatriate association footballers in the Republic of Ireland
English expatriate footballers